Piekary may refer to the following places in Poland:
Piekary, Oława County in Lower Silesian Voivodeship (south-west Poland)
Piekary, Środa Śląska County in Lower Silesian Voivodeship (south-west Poland)
Piekary, Trzebnica County in Lower Silesian Voivodeship (south-west Poland)
Piekary, Łęczyca County in Łódź Voivodeship (central Poland)
Piekary, Pajęczno County in Łódź Voivodeship (central Poland)
Piekary, Piotrków County in Łódź Voivodeship (central Poland)
Piekary, Kraków County in Lesser Poland Voivodeship (south Poland)
Piekary, Proszowice County in Lesser Poland Voivodeship (south Poland)
Piekary, Świętokrzyskie Voivodeship (south-central Poland)
Piekary, Masovian Voivodeship (east-central Poland)
Piekary, Gniezno County in Greater Poland Voivodeship (west-central Poland)
Piekary, Poznań County in Greater Poland Voivodeship (west-central Poland)
Piekary, Turek County in Greater Poland Voivodeship (west-central Poland)
Piekary, West Pomeranian Voivodeship (north-west Poland)
Piekary Śląskie, Silesian Voivodeship

See also